Batu Kawan may refer to:
Batu Kawan
Batu Kawan (federal constituency), represented in the Dewan Rakyat
Batu Kawan (settlement constituency), formerly represented in the Penang Settlement Council (1955–59)